Negley may refer to:

People with the surname
Daniel James Negley Farson (1927–1997), British writer and broadcaster on commercial television
Negley Farson (1890–1960), American author and adventurer
James S. Negley (1826–1901), American Civil War General, farmer, railroader, U.S. Representative from the state of Pennsylvania

Places
Negley, Ohio, census-designated place in northeastern Middleton Township, Columbiana County, Ohio, United States
Negley, Texas, unincorporated community in Red River County, Texas, about ten miles north of Clarksville
Negley station, on the East Busway, located in Shadyside and near the East Liberty and Friendship neighborhoods of Pittsburgh
Fort Negley, fortification built by Union troops after the capture of Nashville, Tennessee during the American Civil War
8802 Negley, minor planet

See also
Negley-Gwinner-Harter House, 5061 Fifth Avenue in the Shadyside neighborhood of Pittsburgh, Pennsylvania, built 1870–1871
Egley